Elladj Baldé (born November 9, 1990) is a Canadian former competitive figure skater. He won the 2015 Nebelhorn Trophy, an ISU Challenger Series event. He is the 2008 Canadian Junior champion.

Personal life 
Elladj Baldé was born November 9, 1990 in Moscow to a Russian mother and a Guinean father, Ibrahim, from the village of Tombon, near Labé. He has two younger sisters, Djoulia Baldé and Catherine Baldé, who also skated. His older sister, Djouldé, died from leukemia. After a year in Bonn, Germany during his sister's treatment, the family moved to Canada in 1992. He speaks English, French, and Russian. On March 18, 2020 he announced his engagement to Michelle Dawley, a dancer and choreographer from Calgary.

Career 

Elladj Baldé was introduced to skating at the age of seven by his mother. Though at first he would hide his skates in an attempt to avoid practice, he began to love skating when he was ten. He was sometimes discouraged by mocking of the sport. His parents also struggled with the expense of skating. In a 2021 interview, he said, "I was lucky that I grew up with coaches that understood our family’s situation and helped us out."

Baldé won the junior silver medal at the 2007 Canadian Championships and won the junior title at the 2008 Canadian Championships. During the 2008–09 season, he won a pair of medals on the ISU Junior Grand Prix series and made his senior national debut at the 2009 Canadian Championships, finishing 10th. Baldé was 8th at the 2009 World Junior Championships.

In 2009, Baldé underwent major surgery after tearing his anterior cruciate ligament (ACL) in his right knee, keeping him off the ice for six months. His doctor gave the go-ahead to resume practicing triples after three months of lighter training on the ice. He missed the entire 2009–10 season.

Baldé returned to competition the following season and placed 5th at the 2011 Canadian Championships. In late 2011, he moved to the United States to train with Yuka Sato and Jason Dungjen at the Detroit Skating Club in Bloomfield Hills, Michigan. He was 4th at the 2012 Canadian Championships.

After identifying a problem with the blade positioning on one of his new boots, Baldé decided to compete at the 2013 Skate Canada International with an older left boot and new right boot, even though one was soft and the other stiff. Both his knees were taped as a result of tendinitis. In the short program, he landed his first quad toe in competition and added a double toe to the end.

Baldé withdrew from the 2014 Skate Canada International on October 30, having sustained a concussion. He relocated to Montreal in or before July 2015, joining Bruno Marcotte and Manon Perron. He won an ISU Challenger Series event, the 2015 Nebelhorn Trophy, improving his personal best by 30 points.

In early September 2017, Baldé sustained his fifth concussion in three or four years. The 2018 Four Continents Championships was his last competition as an eligible figure skater. Skate Canada announced his retirement on May 4, 2018.

Baldé is a co-founder of the Figure Skating Diversity and Inclusion Alliance. He appeared as a choreographer in season 5 (2019) of Battle of the Blades and served as a judge in season 6. He is also active on social media.

Programs

Competitive highlights 
GP: Grand Prix; CS: Challenger Series; JGP: Junior Grand Prix

References

External links 

 
 Elladj Baldé at Skate Canada

1990 births
Canadian male single skaters
Living people
Russian emigrants to Canada
Canadian people of Guinean descent
Sportspeople of Guinean descent
Canadian people of Russian descent